Deir Ballut is a Palestinian town located in the Salfit Governorate in the northern West Bank,  south west of Nablus. According to the Palestinian Central Bureau of Statistics, it had a population of 3,195 in 2007.

Location
It is bordered by Kafr ad Dik to its east, Al Lubban al Gharbi to the south, Kafr Qasem to the west, and Rafat to the north.

History
Sherds from the Iron Age, Roman, Byzantine, Umayyad/Abbasid and Crusader/Ayyubid eras have been found here.

The "great valley" of Wadi Deir Ballut was identified by Charles William Wilson (1836–1905) as the boundary between Judaea and Samaria, as defined by first-century historian Josephus.

Arab geographer Yaqut al-Hamawi records in 1226 that "Deir al-Ballut was a village of district around ar-Ramla."

Ottoman era
In 1838, it was noted as a Muslim village, Deir Balut, in Jurat Merda, south of Nablus.

In 1870 Victor Guérin found it to be a village of one hundred and fifty people. However, judging by the extent of the ruins that covered the hill where it stood, Guérin thought it had once been a large city. Most houses were built with large stones.

In 1882 the PEF's Survey of Western Palestine (SWP) described it as "a small village, partly ruinous, but evidently once a place of greater importance, with rock-cut tombs. The huts are principally of stone. The water supply is from wells." To the west of the village are rock-tombs, from a Christian age.

WWI and British Mandate era
During World War I, Deir Ballut was the site of a minor engagement between Turkish and British troops on March 12, 1918.

In the 1922 census of Palestine Deir Ballut had a population of 384 inhabitants, all Muslim, rising to 532 in the 1931 census, still all Muslim, in a total of 91 houses.

In the 1945 statistics the population was 720, all Muslim while the total land area was 14,789 dunams, according to an official land and population survey. Of this, 508 dunams were for plantations and irrigable land, 3,488 for cereals, while 63 dunams were classified as built-up (urban) areas.

Jordanian era
In the wake of the 1948 Arab–Israeli War, and after the 1949 Armistice Agreements, Deir Ballut came under Jordanian rule. 

In 1961, the population was 1,087.

Post-1967
Since the Six-Day War in 1967, Deir Ballut has been under Israeli occupation.

After the 1995 accords, 5.2% of village land was classified as Area B, the remaining 94.8% as Area C. Israel has confiscated 171 dunums of village land in for the Israeli settlements of Peduel and Alei Zahav.

By 2020, there were reports about untreated sewage from the nearby Israeli settlements of Leshem, Peduel and Beit Aryeh-Ofarim being dumped on Deir Ballut land.

In January 2021 the Israeli military authority had some 3,000 olive trees planted by the villagers uprooted. Many has been planted as long as 15 years earlier. The destruction,on the grounds that the area in question was, in Israeli law, Israeli state property, took place six days after a legal appeal had been made against the order. The authorities then stated that the uprooting occurred before knowledge of the filed appeal papers came to their notice.

See also
Battle of Tell 'Asur
John Macdonald Aiken

References

Bibliography

External links
Welcome To Dayr Ballut
Deir Ballut, IWPS
Deir Balut, Welcome to Palestine
Survey of Western Palestine, Map 14: IAA, Wikimedia commons
Deir Ballut Town (Fact Sheet), Applied Research Institute–Jerusalem (ARIJ)
Deir Ballut Town Profile, ARIJ
Aerial photo, ARIJ
Development Priorities and Needs in Deir Ballut, ARIJ
New Colonial Activity in Deir Ballut Village - Salfit District, 12 March 2000, POICA
War against trees and sheep, 10 March 2004, POICA
Israeli brought wild pigs destroy tens of dunums in Deir Ballut plain, 30 July 2006, POICA
Kfar Ad Dik and Deir Ballut in Salfit Governorate receive New Land confiscation Order, 10 January 2007, POICA
Deir Ballut's fruitful olive trees cut for Wall Constructions, 3 March, 2007, POICA
New Military Orders to Halt Construction of Seven Palestinian Houses in the Village of Deir Ballut, 1 October 2007, POICA
The Israeli Army to demolish an under-construction school in Deir Ballut Village, 14 February 2008, POICA
New house demolition orders in Deir Ballut village, 19 June 2008, POICA
Palestinian homes due to be demolished over 'lack of permits' pretext in Deir Ballut Village, 22 September 2010, ARIJ

Towns in Salfit Governorate
Salfit Governorate
Municipalities of West Bank
Municipalities of the State of Palestine